Munich Land is an electoral constituency (German: Wahlkreis) represented in the Bundestag. It elects one member via first-past-the-post voting. Under the current constituency numbering system, it is designated as constituency 221. It is located in southern Bavaria, comprising Landkreis Munich district.

Munich Land was created for the inaugural 1949 federal election. Since 2009, it has been represented by Florian Hahn of the Christian Social Union (CSU).

Geography
Munich Land is located in southern Bavaria. As of the 2021 federal election, it is coterminous with the Landkreis Munich district.

History
Munich Land was created in 1949. In the 1949 election, it was Bavaria constituency 9 in the numbering system. In the 1953 through 1961 elections, it was number 204. In the 1965 through 1976 elections, it was number 209. In the 1980 through 1998 elections, it was number 208. In the 2002 and 2005 elections, it was number 223. In the 2009 and 2013 elections, it was number 222. Since the 2017 election, it has been number 221.

Originally, the constituency comprised the city of Freising and the districts of Landkreis Munich, Erding, and Freising. In the 1976 election, it comprised the districts of Starnberg and Miesbach and the municipalities of Aying, Baierbrunn, Brunnthal, Gräfelfing, Grünwald, Höhenkirchen-Siegertsbrunn, Neubiberg, Neuried, Oberhaching, Ottobrunn, Planegg, Pullach, Sauerlach, Schäftlarn, Straßlach-Dingharting, and Taufkirchen from the Landkreis Munich district. In the 1980 through 1994 elections, it was coterminous with the Landkreis Munich district. In the 1998 election, it acquired the municipalities of Finsing, Forstern, and Moosinning and the Verwaltungsgemeinschaften of Hörlkofen, Oberding, Oberneuching, and Pastetten from the Erding district. In the 2002 election, it further gained the municipalities of Isen, Lengdorf, and Sankt Wolfgang from the Erding district. In the 2005 and 2009 elections, it comprised the Landkreis Munich and the municipality of Kralling from the Starnberg district. In the 2013 election, it lost the municipality of Kralling and gained the municipality of Gauting. Since the 2017 election, it has been coterminous with the Landkreis Munich district.

Members
The constituency has been held by the Christian Social Union (CSU) during all but one Bundestag term since its creation. It was first represented by Anton Besold of the Bavaria Party (BP) from 1949 to 1953. Franz Seidl of the CSU won it in 1953 and served until 1965. He was succeeded by former member Besold, now a member of the CSU, who served from 1965 to 1969. Albert Probst was representative from 1969 to 1976, followed by Franz-Ludwig Schenk Graf von Stauffenberg for one term. Josef Linsmeier served from 1980 to 1990. Martin Mayer was representative from 1990 to 2005, followed by Georg Fahrenschon for one term. Florian Hahn was elected in 2009, and re-elected in 2013, 2017, and 2021.

Election results

2021 election

2017 election

2013 election

2009 election

Notes

References

Federal electoral districts in Bavaria
1949 establishments in West Germany
Constituencies established in 1949
Munich (district)